The following Union Army and Confederate Army units and commanders fought in the Battle of Cheat Mountain of the American Civil War on September 12 and 13, 1861 in present-day West Virginia.

Abbreviations used

Military rank
 Gen = General
 BG = Brigadier General
 Col = Colonel
 Ltc = Lieutenant Colonel
 Cpt = Captain

Other
 w = wounded
 k = killed

Union Forces

Cheat Mountain District
BG Joseph J. Reynolds

Confederate Forces

Army of the Northwest

Gen Robert E. Lee

See also

 West Virginia in the American Civil War

References

Eicher, John H., & Eicher, David J., Civil War High Commands, Stanford University Press, 2001, .
Lesser, W. Hunter, Rebels at the Gate: Lee and McClellan on the Front Line of a Nation Divided, Sourcebooks, 2004, . 
Newell, Clayton R., Lee vs. McClellan: The First Campaign, Regnery Publishing, 1996, .
 The Official Records of the War of the Rebellion, Ser. 1, Vol. 5, p. 184.

American Civil War orders of battle